Abdulrahman Ragab (Arabic:عبد الرحمن رجب) (born 10 September 1999) is a Qatari born-Egyptian footballer. He currently plays as a defender for Al-Khor.

Career
Abdulrahman Ragab started his career at Al-Khor and is a product of the Al-Khor's youth system. On 21 January 2020, Abdulrahman Ragab made his professional debut for Al-Khor against Al-Sadd in the Pro League .

External links

References

Living people
1999 births
Qatari footballers
Qatari people of Egyptian descent
Naturalised citizens of Qatar
Al-Khor SC players
Qatar Stars League players
Association football defenders
Place of birth missing (living people)